James Wade Gilley (born August 15, 1938) is an American academic. He served as the president of University of Tennessee system from 1999 to 2001. Gilley also was president of Marshall University from 1991 to 1999. He attended Virginia Tech where he earned B.S., M.S., and Ph.D. degrees in engineering. Gilley also taught at Virginia Tech, Bluefield State College, George Mason University, and Marshall University. From 1977 to 1982, he served as Virginia Secretary of Education.

References

1938 births
Living people
Virginia Tech alumni
Harvard Business School alumni
Presidents of Marshall University
State cabinet secretaries of Virginia
Presidents of the University of Tennessee system
People from Grayson County, Virginia